Blakey is a surname, and may refer to:

 Art Blakey
Blakey (album), a 1954 album by Art Blakey
 George Blakey
 John Blakey
 Marion Blakey
 Michael Blakey (disambiguation)
 Nicholas Blakey (died 1758), Irish-born draughtsman and engraver
 Richard Blakey
 G. Robert Blakey, a law professor and an expert on organized crime
 Cyril "Blakey" Blake, an inspector in sitcom On the Buses played by Stephen Lewis
 DJ Blakey, a DJ from London, UK

Also in the place name:
 Blakey Ridge, a ridge of hills near Kirkbymoorside, North Yorkshire

See also
 Blaikie
 Blake